Émile Zermani (25 September 1911 – 10 May 1983) was a French football player.

He was capped once for France in 1935.

Honours
 French Division 1 winner 1937
 Coupe de France (2) 1935, 1938

References

External links
 Player card at om-passion.com (French)
 
 
 
 

1911 births
1983 deaths
French footballers
France international footballers
Ligue 1 players
Olympique de Marseille players
FC Sète 34 players
Nîmes Olympique players
People from El Attaf
Association football midfielders
Migrants from French Algeria to France